East Asian art includes:

Chinese art
Japanese art
Korean art

See also
 History of Eastern art

East Asian art